The following is a comprehensive list of New Zealand-born Australian country music recording artist Keith Urban's concert tours. Urban has embarked on thirteen headlining concerts tours, and one co-headlining concerts tours since 2004. His first tour was the Livin' Right Now Tour. The Speed of Now World Tour was his thirteenth and most recent headlining tour.

CMT on Tour: Keith Urban Be Here '04 (2004)

The CMT on Tour: Keith Urban Be Here '04 was Urban's first headlining concert tour and was in support of his fourth studio album Be Here (2004). It began on 8 October 2004 in Muncie, Indiana and finished on 13 November 2004 in Cleveland, Ohio.

Opening act
Katrina Elam

Tour dates

Livin' Right Now Tour (2004)
The Livin' Right Now Tour was Urban's second headlining concert tour. It was in support of his fourth studio album Be Here (2004).

Alive in '05 (2005)
The Alive in '05 was Urban's second headlining concert tour. It was in support of his fourth studio album Be Here (2004).

Still Alive in '06 (2006)
The Still Alive in '06 was Urban's third headlining concert tour.

Love, Pain & the Whole Crazy World Tour (2007)
The Love, Pain & the Whole Crazy World was Urban's four headlining concert tour. It was in support of his fifth studio album Love, Pain & the Whole Crazy Thing (2006).

A.C.M Presents: Keith Urban & Rory Gilliatte '6 String Bandits' Tour (2008)
The A.C.M Presents Keith Urban & Rory Gilliatte '6 String Bandits' Tour

Love, Pain & the Whole Crazy Carnival Ride Tour (2007)
The Love, Pain & the Whole Crazy Carnival Ride Tour was co-headlining concert tour by Urban American country music singer Carrie Underwood! It was in support of his fifth studio album Love, Pain & the Whole Crazy Thing (2006) and her second studio album Carnival Ride.

Escape Together Tour (2009)
The Escape Together was Urban's fifth headlining concert tour.

Summer Lovin' 2010 Tour (2010)
The Summer Lovin' 2010 Tour was Urban's sixth headlining concert tour.

Get Closer 2011 World Tour (2011)
The Get Closer 2011 World Tour was Urban's seventh headlining concert tour. It was in support of his seventh studio album Get Closer (2011). The tour began on 8 April 2011 in Adelaide, South Australia and finished on 15 October 2011 in Minneapolis, Minnesota.

Light the Fuse Tour (2013–14)
The Light the Fuse Tour was Urban's eighth headlining concert tour. It was in support of his eighth studio album Fuse (2013). The tour began on 18 July 2013 in Cincinnati, Ohio and finished on 29 June 2014 in Perth, Western Australia.

Raise 'Em Up Tour (2014)
The Raise 'Em Up Tour was Urban's ninth headlining concert tour. It was in support of his eighth studio album Fuse (2013). It began on 12 July 2014 in. Alberta and completed on 7 September 2014 in Wheatland, California. This was the second tour to promote Fuse.

ripCORD World Tour (2016)
The ripCORD World Tour was Urban's tenth headlining concert tour. It was in support of his ninth studio album Ripcord (2016). It began on 2 June 2016 in Bonner Springs and completed on 17 December 2016 in Brisbane, Queensland. The Oceania leg of the tour was co-headlined with Carrie Underwood.

Graffiti U World Tour (2018–19)

The Graffiti U World Tour was Urban's eleventh headlining concert tour and was in support of his ninth studio album Ripcord (2016). It began on 15 June 2018 in Maryland Heights, Missouri and finished on 10 March 2019 in Dublin, Ireland.

Opening acts
North America
Kelsea Ballerini
Lindsay Ell
Julia Michaels

Europe
Cam
Brett Eldredge
Chase Rice
Drake White
Kerri Watt

Setlist
The following setlist comes from the opening night in Maryland Heights, Missouri on 15 June 2018. The covers were not performed in Noblesville, Indiana.

"Meet Me in St. Louis, Louis" 
"Never Comin Down"
"Coming Home"
"Somewhere in My Car"
"Days Go By"
"Parallel Line"
"Long Hot Summer"
"My Wave" 
"You Gonna Fly"
"Somebody Like You"
"Texas Time"
"Where the Blacktop Ends"
"Blue Ain't Your Color"

"Drop Top"
"Cop Car"
"Slow Hands" 
"Lights Down Los" 
"The Fighter"
Medley: "Who Wouldn't Wanna Be Me"/"Kiss a Girl"/"You Look Good in My Shirt"
"Gone Tomorrow (Here Today)"
"Little Bit of Everything"
"John Cougar, John Deere, John 3:16"
"Wasted Time"
Encore
"But for the Grace of God"
"Horses"

Tour dates

A. These shows were part of the C2C: Country to Country festival.

Box score

References

Concert tours
Urban, Keith